The Elevation of the Holy Cross is one of the Great Feasts of the Orthodox Church.

Elevation of the Cross or Raising of the Cross may also refer to:

The Elevation of the Cross (Rubens), a 1610-1611 painting by Peter Paul Rubens
The Raising of the Cross, a c.1633 painting by Rembrandt